East Okoboji Lake is a natural body of water, approximately 1,835 acres (7.43 km²) in area, in Dickinson County in northwest Iowa in the United States. It is part of the chain of lakes known as the Iowa Great Lakes. The area was long inhabited by the Santee or Eastern Dakota Sioux.  The lake was known after its Dakota-language name, Okoboozhy, meaning reeds and rushes.

History
The towns of Spirit Lake and Okoboji, founded as European-American settlements in the nineteenth century, sit along its western shore.  They became notable after the Spirit Lake Massacre of 1857, when a renegade band of Sioux attacked the frontier settlements, in part for food, because they were suffering starvation during a severe winter with heavy snows. It was the last Native American attack in Iowa against settlers.

Geology
Geologically, the lake, like its neighbors, is a glacial pothole, a remnant of the most recent ice age approximately 13,000 years ago.

The lake is shallow, with an average depth of 10 ft (3 m) and a maximum depth of 22 ft (7 m). During the summer months, it is prone to stratification and to overgrowth with algae.

Fishing
The lake is a popular fishing destination in the region, for both open water and ice fishing. East and West Lake Okoboji have a healthy population of numerous species including: Black Crappie, Bluegill, Channel Catfish, Largemouth Bass, Muskie, Northern Pike, Smallmouth Bass, Walleye, White Bass, Yellow Bass, Yellow Bullhead, and Yellow Perch.

Media 
The lake was the main setting of the fourth X-Files episode, The Conduit. However, the episode was filmed in British Columbia, with Buntzen Lake being used as Lake Okobogee.

See also 
 Big Spirit Lake
 West Okoboji Lake

References

External links

 Iowa Great Lakes Region
Iowa Department of Natural Resources site on East Okoboji Lake
University of Iowa site on East Okoboji Lake chemistry

Bodies of water of Dickinson County, Iowa
Lakes of Iowa